Daniel Iftodi (born 11 February 1968 in Beștepe, Tulcea County) is a Romanian former football player, who played as a midfielder. He played for all the major Bucharest-based teams (Steaua București, Dinamo București and Rapid București), making 372 appearances in Liga I in the sixteen seasons in which he played top-flight football in Romania.

Honours 

Steaua Bucuresti:
 Liga I(3):1992–1993, 1993–1994, 1994–1995
Dinamo Bucuresti:
 Liga I(1):1999–2000
 Cupa României(1):1999–2000
Rapid Bucuresti:
 Cupa României(1):1997–1998

References
 

1968 births
Living people
People from Tulcea County
Romanian footballers
Association football wingers
Romanian expatriate footballers
Expatriate footballers in Hungary
Romanian expatriate sportspeople in Hungary
AFC Dacia Unirea Brăila players
FC Steaua București players
FC Dinamo București players
FC Rapid București players
ACF Gloria Bistrița players
FCM Bacău players
Liga I players
Nemzeti Bajnokság I players